My Brilliant Friend is an Italian- and Neapolitan-language coming-of-age drama television series created by Saverio Costanzo for HBO, RAI and TIMvision. Named after the first of four novels in the Neapolitan Novels series by Elena Ferrante, the series will adapt the entire literary work into four eight-episode seasons. My Brilliant Friend is a co-production between Italian production companies Wildside, Fandango, The Apartment, Mowe and international film groups Umedia and Fremantle.

The first two episodes were presented at the 75th Venice International Film Festival, in 2018. The first season premiered on HBO on November 18, 2018, and on Rai 1 and TIMvision on November 27, 2018. A second season, based on Ferrante's second Neapolitan Novel and titled My Brilliant Friend: The Story of a New Name, was confirmed in December 2018, and premiered on Rai 1 on February 10, 2020, and on HBO on March 16, 2020. The first two episodes of the second season were screened in selected Italian cinemas from January 27 to 29, 2020.

In April 2020, the series was renewed for a third season, based on the third novel in the series, Those Who Leave and Those Who Stay. The eight-episode third season premiered on Rai 1 on February 6, 2022, and on HBO on February 28, 2022. In March 2022, the series was renewed for a fourth and final season, based on the final novel in Ferrante's series: The Story of the Lost Child.

Cast and characters

Main
Elisa Del Genio (season 1, guest season 2), Margherita Mazzucco (seasons 1–3) and Alba Rohrwacher (season 4, cameo season 3) as Elena "Lenù" Greco, a girl from a poor neighbourhood in the outskirts of 1950s Naples. Rohrwacher also narrates the events of the series from the point of view of adult Elena Greco. The character is also portrayed by Elisabetta De Palo (guest season 1) as a senior, and by Ingrid Del Genio (guest season 1) as a very young child.
Ludovica Nasti (season 1, guest season 2) and Gaia Girace (seasons 1–3) as Raffaella "Lila" Cerullo, Elena's best friend and, later, Stefano Carracci's wife
Anna Rita Vitolo as Immacolata Greco, Elena's mother
Luca Gallone as Vittorio Greco, a porter and Elena's father
Imma Villa as Manuela Solara (seasons 1–3), Silvio Solara's wife, Michele and Marcello's mother
Antonio Milo as Silvio Solara (season 1; recurring season 2), owner of the Bar Solara
Alessio Gallo as Michele Solara (seasons 2–3; recurring season 1), Silvio and Manuela's son. The character is also portrayed by Adriano Tammaro (recurring season 1) as a child.
Valentina Acca as Nunzia Cerullo (seasons 1–2), Lila's mother
Antonio Buonanno as Fernando Cerullo, a shoemaker and Lila's father
Dora Romano as Miss Oliviero (seasons 1–2), Elena and Lila's elementary school teacher
Nunzia Schiano as Nella Incardo (seasons 1–2), Miss Oliviero's cousin
Giovanni Amura as Stefano Carracci (seasons 2–3; recurring season 1), Don Achille Carracci's son and, later, Lila's husband. The character is also portrayed by Kristijan Di Giacomo (recurring season 1) as a child.
Gennaro De Stefano as Rino Cerullo (season 2; recurring season 1), Lila's older brother and, later, Pinuccia's husband. The character is also portrayed by Tommaso Rusciano (recurring season 1) as a child.
Francesco Serpico as Nino Sarratore (seasons 2–3; recurring season 1), Donato and Lidia's son. The character is also portrayed by Alessandro Nardi (guest season 1) as a child.
Federica Sollazzo as Pinuccia Carracci (season 2; recurring season 1), Don Achille's daughter and, later, Rino's wife. The character is also portrayed by Giuliana Tramontano (recurring season 1) as a child.
Clotilde Sabatino as Professor Galiani (seasons 2–3), Elena's high school teacher. The character is also portrayed by Anna Redi (recurring season 1) as a younger woman.
Ulrike Migliaresi as Ada Cappuccio (season 2; recurring season 1), Melina Cappuccio's daughter. The character is also portrayed by Lucia Manfuso (recurring season 1) as a child.
Christian Giroso as Antonio Cappuccio (season 2; recurring season 1), Melina Cappuccio's son. The character is also portrayed by Domenico Cuomo (recurring season 1) as a child
Eduardo Scarpetta as Pasquale Peluso (seasons 2–3; recurring season 1), Alfredo and Giuseppina's son. The character is also portrayed by Francesco Catena (recurring season 1) as a child.
Giovanni Buselli as Enzo Scanno (seasons 2–3; recurring season 1), Nicola and Assunta's son. The character is also portrayed by Vincenzo Vaccaro (recurring season 1) as a child.
Giovanni Cannata as Armando Galiani (seasons 2–3), Professor Galiani's son
Francesco Russo as Bruno Soccavo (seasons 2–3), Nino's friend
Bruno Orlando as Franco Mari (seasons 2–3), Elena's first boyfriend in Pisa
Daria Deflorian as Adele Airota (seasons 2–3), Pietro Airota's mother
Matteo Cecchi as Pietro Airota (seasons 2–3), Elena's second boyfriend in Pisa
Giulia Mazzarino as Maria Rosa Airota (season 3; recurring season 2), Pietro's sister
Gabriele Vacis as Guido Airota (season 3; recurring season 2), Pietro's father
Maria Vittoria Dallasta as Silvia (season 3), a student and a young mother
Riccardo Palmieri as Gino (season 3; recurring seasons 1–2), Elena's classmate and first boyfriend. He becomes a fascist.
Giorgia Gargano as Nadia Galiani (season 3; recurring season 2), Professor Galiani's daughter
Fabrizio Cottone as Alfonso Carracci (season 3; recurring seasons 1–2), Don Achille's son. The character is also portrayed by Valerio Laviano Saggese (guest season 1) as a child.
Rosaria Langellotto as Gigliola Spagnuolo (season 3; recurring seasons 1–2), their daughter. The character is also portrayed by Alice D'Antonio (guest season 1) as a child.
Pina Di Gennaro as Melina Cappuccio (season 3; recurring seasons 1–2), a crazy widow
Francesca Pezzella as Carmela Peluso (season 3; recurring seasons 1–2), Alfredo and Giuseppina's daughter. The character is also portrayed by Francesca Bellamoli (season 1) as a child.
Sofia Luchetti as Adele Airota (season 3), Elena and Pietro's daughter
Salvatore Tortora as Gennaro "Gennarino" Carracci (season 3), Lila's son
Elvis Esposito as Marcello Solara (season 3; recurring seasons 1–2), Manuela and Silvio's son. The character is also portrayed by Pietro Vuolo (season 1) as a child.
Francesca Montuori as Elisa Greco (season 3), Elena's younger sister. The character is also portrayed by Sara Mauriello (recurring season 1), Cristina Fraticola (recurring seasons 1–2) and Gaia Buongiovanni (recurring season 3; guest season 2) as a child.
Chiara Celotto as Eleonora (season 3), Nino's wife
Sophia Protino as Elsa Airota (season 3), Elena and Pietro's daughter. The character is also portrayed by Aria and Luce Milighetti (guests season 3) as a very young child.

Featured
The following actors are credited in the opening titles of a single episode of the series:
Antonio Pennarella as Don Achille Carracci (season 1), the local mobster
Edu Rejón as Juan (season 3), a student in Milan
Giulia Pica as a doctor (season 3), who provides contraceptives in Naples
Claudio Lardo as Giuntini (season 3), chief editor at l'Unità
Mirko Setaro as Lila's cardiologist (season 3)
Vittorio Ciorcalo as Lila's neurologist (season 3)
Giovanni Toscano as Mario's friend (season 3), a student in Florence
Eugenio Di Fraia as Mario Gioia (season 3), an engineer in Florence
Rebecca Fanucchi as Clelia (season 3), Adele's baby sitter in Florence
Iacopo Ricciotti as Maria Rosa's boyfriend (season 3)

Recurring
The Grecos
Emanuele Nocerino (season 1), Matteo Castaldo (seasons 1–2) and Daniele Cacciatore (season 3; guest season 2) as Peppe Greco, Elena's younger brother
Thomas Noioso (season 1), Raffaele Nocerino (seasons 1–2) and Davide De Lucia (season 3; guest season 2) as Gianni Greco, Elena's younger brother

The Carraccis
Sarah Falanga as Maria Carracci (seasons 1–2; guest season 3), Don Achille's wife
Daniel Campagna (guest season 2) and Giuseppe Cortese (season 3; guest season 2) as Gennaro Carracci, Lila's son
Maria Raffaella Cortese as Maria Carracci (guest season 3), Lila's daughter

The Pelusos
Gennaro Canonico as Alfredo Peluso (season 1), a highly skilled carpenter
Lia Zinno as Giuseppina Peluso (seasons 1–2), Alfredo's wife

The Sarratores
Emanuele Valenti as Donato Sarratore (seasons 1–2), a train controller
Fabrizia Sacchi as Lidia Sarratore (seasons 1–2), Donato's wife
Cristina Magnotti (season 1) and Miriam D'Angelo (seasons 1–2) as Marisa Sarratore, Donato and Lidia's daughter
Michele Di Costanzo (guest season 1) and Catello Buonomo (season 2; guest season 1) as Pino Sarratore, Donato and Lidia's son
Federica Guarino (guest season 1) and Federica Barbuto (season 2; guest season 1) as Clelia Sarratore, Donato and Lidia's daughter
Gioele Maddi (guest season 1) and Mattia Iapigio (season 2; guest season 1) as Ciro Sarratore, Donato and Lidia's son
Jordan Andres Ayala Robles as Albertino Sarratore (guest season 3), Nino's son
Matthias Strepponi as Mirko Sarratore (guest season 3), Nino's son

The Scannos
Ciro Pugliese as Nicola Scanno (season 1), a greengrocer
Marina Cioppa as Assunta Scanno (season 1), Nicola's wife

The Spagnuolos
Mimmo Ruggiero as Mr. Spagnuolo (season 1; guest season 2), pastry chef at Bar Solara
Patrizia Di Martino as Rosa Spagnuolo (season 1; guest season 2), his wife

The Cerullos
Francesco Saggiomo as Dino Cerullo (season 2), Rino and Pinuccia's son

The Galianis
Riccardo Russo as Marco Galiani (guest season 3)

Others
Valentina Arena as Jolanda (season 1; guest seasons 2–3), a stationer
Vittorio Viviani as Mr. Ferraro (season 1), the librarian and an elementary school teacher
Sergio Basile as Professor Gerace (season 1), Elena's high school teacher
Giuseppe Brunetti as Dario (season 2)
Paolo Tarallo as Filippo (season 3)

Guests
Antonio Maglione as Alfonso (season 1), a friend of Vittorio Greco's
Enrico D'Errico as Pier Paolo Pasolini (season 2)
Giustiniano Alpi as Rolando Berti (season 2)
Alessandro Bertoncini as Carlo Fortini (season 2)
Ilaria Zanotti as Giulia Cristaldi (season 2)
Maria Rosaria Bozzon as Titina (season 2), Gennaro's baby sitter
Maurizio Tabani as Professor Tarratano, a critic (seasons 2–3)
Vincenzo Antonucci as Edo (season 3)
Ianua Coeli Linhart as Isabella (season 3)
Antonella Romano as Teresa (season 3)
Giulia Weber as Marcella (season 3)
Roberta Geremicca as Maria (season 3)
Riccardo Fara as Luciano (season 3)

Episodes

Season 1 (2018)

 Notes

Season 2: The Story of a New Name (2020)

Season 3: Those Who Leave and Those Who Stay (2022)

Production

Commissioned by Rai Fiction, HBO and TIMvision, the first season was produced by Italian production companies Wildside and Fandango and international film group Umedia. TIMvision withdrew from the project after the first season, while production companies The Apartment and Mowe joined production for the second season.

On February 18, 2020, Gaia Girace announced that she would leave the series after playing Lila in three episodes of the third season, as a new and older actress would be cast for the following episodes. However, the director of the third season, Daniele Luchetti, later opted to retain Girace and Mazzucco for the duration of the season.

Music
The score of the series is composed by Max Richter.

Season 1

The soundtrack album for the first season was released by Deutsche Grammophon on December 7, 2018, for digital download. It was preceded by the release of the single "Elena & Lila" on November 30, 2018.

Track listing

Additional music
The first season features additional material from Richter's solo discography.

Season 2

The soundtrack album for the second season was released by Deutsche Grammophon on May 1, 2020, for digital download. The soundtrack features material from Richter's solo discography.

Track listing

Season 3

The soundtrack album for the third season was released by Deutsche Grammophon on March 4, 2022, for digital download. The soundtrack features material from Richter's solo discography.

Track listing

Reception
The series has received critical acclaim. On Rotten Tomatoes, the first season has a 93% "certified fresh" rating with an average score of 8.4 out of 10 based on 57 reviews. The site's critical consensus is, "My Brilliant Friend is an expansive epic that gleans rapturous beauty from the most desolate of circumstances, but it is the intimacy between the central duo – and the remarkable performances that bring them to life – that audiences will remember most vividly". On Metacritic, it has a score of 87 out of 100 based on 20 reviews, indicating "universal acclaim". Rhiannon Lucy Cosslett of The Guardian stated "How revolutionary it still feels to see female friendship explored onscreen in this way. It goes without saying that it takes the Bechdel test and turns it into ragù."

On Rotten Tomatoes, the second season has a 100% "certified fresh" rating with an average score of 9.5 out of 10 based on 15 reviews. The site's critical consensus is, "Gorgeously shot and full of incredible performances, My Brilliant Friends second season expands its small world with rich results." On Metacritic, it has a score of 92 out of 100 based on 8 reviews, indicating "universal acclaim".

On Rotten Tomatoes, the third season has a 100% "certified fresh" rating with an average score of 9.2 out of 10 based on 11 reviews. On Metacritic, it has a score of 96 out of 100 based on 6 reviews, indicating "universal acclaim".

In 2019, My Brilliant Friend was nominated for a Peabody Award.

Home media
On April 2, 2019, HBO Home Entertainment released the first season on DVD and Digital in region 1.

Notes

References

External links

2010s Italian drama television series
2010s American drama television series
2020s Italian drama television series
2018 American television series debuts
2018 Italian television series debuts
2020s American drama television series
HBO original programming
Italian-language television shows
Television series set in the 1950s
Television series set in the 1960s
Television series set in the 1970s
Television shows set in Italy
Television series by Fremantle (company)
Television series based on works by Elena Ferrante